Excess ovarian androgen release syndrome is a cutaneous condition usually seen in young women between the ages of 16 and 20.

See also 
 Adrenal SAHA syndrome
 List of cutaneous conditions

References 

Endocrine-related cutaneous conditions
Syndromes